Lamine is a given name and a surname. Lamin is the local name for Al-Amin (a title given to the prophet Mohammed which means "the trustworthy"). Notable people with the name include:

Ould Lamine Abdallah (born 1929), French former long-distance runner who competed in the 1952 Summer Olympics
Lamine El Jaafari  (born 1983), Sahraoui French well recognized software programmer CEO & co-founder of LAMINE-TECH Limited a high tech services company Amiens, France.
Mohamed Lamine Ould Ahmed (born 1947), Sahrawi politician, writer and member of the Polisario Front
Lamine Ben Aziza (born 1952), Tunisian football goalkeeper
Amadou Lamine Ba, the ambassador of Senegal to the United States, appointed in 2002
Lamine Bá (born 1994), Bissau-Guinean footballer
Lamine Bechichi (1927–2020), Algerian politician
Lamine Bey or Muhammad VIII al-Amin (1881–1962), the last bey of Tunisia
Mohamed Lamine Chakhari (born 1957), Tunisian politician
Lamine Conteh or Lamin Conteh (born 1976), nicknamed Junior Tumbu, Sierra Leonean international footballer
Mohamed Lamine Debaghine (1917–2003), Algerian politician and independence activist
Lamine Diack (1933–2021), the Chairman of the Board of the National Water Company "Société Nationale des Eaux" of Senegal
Lamine Diakhate (1928–1987), author, poet and literary critic of the négritude school, politician and diplomat
Lamine Diane (born 1997), Senegalese basketball player
Lamine Diarra (born 1983), Senegalese football striker
Lamine Diarrassouba (born 1986), footballer
Lamine Diatta (born 1975), Senegalese footballer
Lamine Diawara (born 1971), Malian basketball player with Al Ittihad Aleppo in Syria
Lamine Diawara (Malian footballer), Malian professional footballer
Lamine Djaballah (born 1982), French professional footballer
Lamine Fall (born 1992), Senegalese footballer
Lamine Gassama (born 1989), Senegalese footballer
Lamine Guèye (1891–1968), Senegalese politician who became leader of the Senegalese Party of Socialist Action
Lamine Guèye (skier) (18 July 1960, Dakar) is a Senegalese skier and president of the Senegalese Ski Federation
Ali Lamine Kab (born 1985), Algerian football player
Lamine Kanté (born 1987), French basketball player
Lamine Khene (born 1930), Algerian nationalist politician and former officer
Lamine Koné (born 1989), French football player of Ivorian descent
Lamine Kourouma (born 1987), professional footballer
Issa Lamine, Nigerien politician
Mahmadu Lamine (died 1887), nineteenth-century Senegalese marabout who led an unsuccessful rebellion against the French colonial government
Mohamed Lamine disambiguation page
Nasir Lamine (born 1985), Ghanaian football player who, playing for New Edubiase United
Philippe Lamine (born 1976), French athlete who specialises in the hurdles
Mamadou Lamine Loum (born 1952), Senegalese political figure
Serigne Mouhamadou Lamine Bara Mbacké, or Sheikh Bara Mbacké (1925–2010), the Grand Marabout of the Mouride movement in Senegal
Ahmadou Lamine Ndiaye (born 1937), former professor of Veterinary Sciences from Senegal
Lamine N'Diaye (born 1956), Senegalese football coach, former player, technical director of Congolese club side TP Mazembe
Lamine Ouahab (born 1984), professional Moroccan tennis player
Lamine Sakho (born 1977), Senegalese footballer
Lamine Sambe (born 1989), French basketball player
Ludovic Lamine Sané (born 1987), Senegalese international footballer
Mohamed Lamine Sanha (died 2007), Bissau-Guinean Naval Chief of Staff
Muhamed Lamine Jabula Sano or Malá (footballer) (born 1979), Bissau-Guinean football midfielder
Lamine Sidimé (born 1944), the President of the Supreme Court of Guinea
Mohamed Lamine Sissoko or Mohamed Sissoko (born 1985), professional footballer
Sadio Lamine Sow, the Minister of Foreign Affairs and International Cooperation of Mali since 24 April 2012
Mohamed Lamine Sylla (1971–2010), Guinean footballer
Lamine Tamba (born 1985), Senegalese footballer
Lamine Traoré (born 1982), Burkina Faso footballer
Lamine Traoré (born 1993), Malian footballer
Mamadou Lamine Traoré (1947–2007), Malian politician and President of the MIRIA political party
Mohamed Lamine Traoré (born 1991), Guinean footballer
Mohamed Lamine Yattara (born 1993), Guinean international footballer
Ali Lamine Zeine, Nigerien politician and economist
Mohamed Lamine Zemmamouche (born 1985), Algerian footballer
Liamine Zéroual (born 1941), the fourth President of Algeria 1994–1999
Lamine Ly (born 1987), The most baanvast gast int stad

See also
Lamine Township, Cooper County, Missouri, one of 14 townships in Cooper County, in the U.S. state of Missouri
Lamine, Wallonia, a district of the municipality of Remicourt, Belgium, in the province of Liège
Lamine River 63.8-mile-long (102.7 km) tributary of the Missouri River in central Missouri in the United States
Stade Lamine Guèye, multi-use stadium in Kaolack, Senegal
Lamaline
Lamin
Lamoine (disambiguation)